The 1901 Auckland City mayoral election was part of the New Zealand local elections held that same year. Elections were held for the Mayor of Auckland on 24 April 1901. The previous mayor, David Goldie, was held in high regard by both the city councillors and the voters but he did not contest the poll; as a temperance advocate, he did not want to toast the Duke and Duchess of Cornwall and York who were to visit in June 1901 with alcohol. John Logan Campbell, who had become regarded as the Father of Auckland, was asked to represent the city. Campbell agreed on the proviso that he would only take on representative functions, with most mayoral tasks taken on by a deputy, and resign after the royal visit. Against general expectation, the mayoralty was contested by a brewer—Daniel Arkell—who had never held any public roles. Campbell won the election with nearly 80% of the votes, with senior city councillor Alfred Kidd deputising for him. Upon Campbell's resignation in July 1901, Kidd was elected the next mayor by his fellow city councillors.

Background

David Goldie had been a popular mayor since 1898, getting re-elected without opposition in 1899 and 1900. Goldie was a teetotaller and when it became known that the Duke and Duchess of Cornwall and York would come for a royal visit, he retired at the April 1901 election as he did not want to toast the visiting royals with alcohol. There was a strong groundswell of opinion that the city's mayoralty should be held by someone of high status for the occasion of the royal visit, and a requisition was put to John Logan Campbell on 11 March. Campbell had lived in Auckland since 1840 and was thus the longest-lived resident of the city; he had become known as the Father of Auckland. Campbell was nominated by the outgoing mayor, Goldie, and by George Fowlds, MHR for City of Auckland.

It had been hoped that Campbell would be declared elected unopposed. Joseph Witheford, MHR for the City of Auckland electorate, received a requisition on 14 March signed by 600 citizens. He considered the situation for half a day and then announced that Campbell should be mayor during the time of the royal visit. By advertisement in The New Zealand Herald on 4 April, brewer Daniel Arkell announced himself as a mayoral candidate. The New Zealand Herald was a strong supporter of Campbell and they dedicated just three lines to Arkell on 4 April, and then mentioned him next when they reported on the nominations on 12 April. The first discussion of Arknell by The Herald was in an opinion piece on 17 April, where his candidacy was described as "something approaching an absurdity". On the same day, the Auckland Star ran its first story on Arkell, as he had been approached by a deputation urging him to withdraw from the contest; Arkell had rebuffed the deputation. On the same day, the Auckland Star described Arkell's candidacy as "in questionable taste". Campbell responded to the situation by that he was happy to contest the election, but that he would not undertake any campaigning whatsoever, and that he wished that nobody campaigned on his behalf. He declared that should he be elected, "it will be by the spontaneous voice of the community".

Mayoral results

The mayoral election was held across all wards: East, North, South, Ponsonby, and Grafton. The polling was conducted using the standard first-past-the-post voting method. As expected, Campbell won by a large margin.

 
 
 
 
 
 

Campbell was installed by Goldie as the outgoing mayor on 8 May 1901. As Campbell had indicated that, due to his age (he was 83 at the time), he wanted to concentrate on the representative functions of the office, and only serve until the royal visit. Campbell suggested that councillor Alfred Kidd should be appointed as deputy mayor; Kidd had deputised for Goldie at times. When it came to formalise this arrangement, it was found that a deputy mayor could only deputise during the mayor's absence or illness; Kidd's role was thus described as being associated with the mayor. The royal visit happened in mid-June and Campbell resigned as mayor on 25 July. In accordance with the legislation at the time, it was up to the city councillors to elect a new mayor and on 30 July, Kidd was unanimously elected as the city's next mayor.

Councillor results
For Auckland Council, elections were held in three wards: South (3 positions; 5 candidates), Ponsonby (3 positions; 4 candidates), and Grafton (3 positions; 5 candidates). In the North and East wards, there were three candidates in each ward, which matched the number of positions available, and these candidates were therefore declared elected unopposed. In total, 15 positions were available and 20 candidates stood in the various wards.

 
 
 
 
 
 
 
 
 
 
 
 
 
 
 
 
 
 
 
 

Kidd's election as mayor caused a vacancy. A by-election held in the Grafton ward on 21 August 1901 returned John McLeod as the new city councillor.

Footnotes

See also
Royal Visit of the Duke and Duchess of Cornwall and York to New Zealand

References

Mayoral elections in Auckland
1901 elections in New Zealand
Politics of the Auckland Region
1900s in Auckland